Gretchen Berg may refer to:

 Gretchen J. Berg (born 1971), American writer and television producer
 Gretchen Berg, a character in the TV series Heroes